Endgame is the first commercially released EP by American Christian metal band Blood of the Martyrs and is the group's first release with lead vocalist Jason Wilkins. The EP was produced by Andreas Magnusson, who has worked with bands such as Haste the Day, Oh, Sleeper, and Impending Doom.

Background and sound
After completing touring for their second studio album Completionist, Blood of the Martyrs announced in early 2014 that they had started writing new music. Shortly after the announcement lead vocalist/keyboardist Lee Zook announced that he would be leaving the band. Blood of the Martyrs hired Eric Hendricks as a touring vocalist, releasing a re-recorded version of "Lady Nightshade" from their debut album with Hendricks. In 2015 the band announced they had hired Jason Wilkins as their new vocalist and would resume work on the record. On January 22, 2016 the band premiered a video for the single "The Devil's Grip" via Revolver'''s website. The EP's second single, "Dr. Killinger", was released on February 14.

The sound of the EP resembles more of a metalcore sound, as opposed to the band's previous deathcore/symphonic metal sound heard on previous releases. The album also features clean vocals, something only previously heard on the band's cover songs. Every song title is a reference to Adult Swim's The Venture Bros.''.

Track listing

Personnel
 Jason Wilkins – lead vocals
 David Sanders – guitar
 Bobby Huotari – bass, backing vocals
 Michael "Pak Man" Pak – drums

References

2016 EPs
Blood of the Martyrs albums
Self-released EPs
Metalcore EPs